Feta Ahamada (born 24 June 1987) is a track and field sprint athlete who competes internationally for Comoros. She has competed at both the 2008 Summer Olympics in Beijing, China, and at the 2012 Games in London, United Kingdom.

Athletics
She holds a personal best over the 100 metres of 11.59 seconds. Competing at the 2011 IAAF World Championships in Athletics, held in Daegu, South Korea, Ahamada represented her nation on 27 August in the preliminary round. She came second in the second heat, with a time of 12.27 seconds, behind Cameroon's Delphine Atangana. In the sixth heat of the quarterfinals on 28 August, she finished in a time of 12.22 seconds, in seventh place. This was 1.1 seconds slower than the heat's winner, Myriam Soumaré of France.

Olympics
Ahamada represented Comoros at the 2008 Summer Olympics in Beijing, China. She competed at the 100 metres and placed sixth in her heat without advancing to the second round. She ran the distance in a time of 11.88 seconds, some 0.55 seconds behind the winner, Ivet Lalova of Bulgaria. However, she was ahead of Gambia's Fatou Tiyana (12.25 seconds) and Beauty Nazum Nahar from Bangladesh (12.52 seconds).

She appeared in a photographic exhibition of Arabic women in sport in London, United Kingdom, shortly prior to the 2012 Summer Olympics in the same city. She said when discussing her exhibit, "If covering your body or your hair makes you feel comfortable, it's not a handicap, it's only sport. Everyone should do want they want." At the London Games, she won her heat of the women's 100 metres in a time of 11.81 seconds on 3 August. In the quarterfinals, on the same day, Ahamada was eliminated after posting a time of 11.86 seconds and finishing in seventh position.

Notes

References

External links

1987 births
Living people
French sportspeople of Comorian descent
Comorian female sprinters
French female sprinters
Olympic athletes of the Comoros
Athletes (track and field) at the 2008 Summer Olympics
Athletes (track and field) at the 2012 Summer Olympics
World Athletics Championships athletes for the Comoros
Sportspeople from Clichy, Hauts-de-Seine
Olympic female sprinters